D.R.A.G.O.N. Force is a 1989 computer wargame published by Interstel Corporation for Amiga and MS-DOS. The name is an acronym for "Drastic Response Assault Group Operations Network."

Gameplay
D.R.A.G.O.N. Force is a strategy game in which the player commands a squad of commandos.

Reception
Jesse W. Cheng reviewed the game for Computer Gaming World, and stated that "there is a nice flavor to the game, as one really feels like he or she is in the middle of a firefight with all the chaos and confusion."

Reviews
Computer Gaming World - Jun, 1992
Amiga Power - May, 1991
ASM (Aktueller Software Markt) - Sep, 1990

References

1989 video games
Amiga games
DOS games
Turn-based strategy video games
Video games about terrorism
Video games developed in the United States